is a museum of Japanese paper in Ino, Kōchi Prefecture, Japan. It focuses on the production of Tosa Washi, dating back over a thousand years, and paper is also made by hand in a workshop on site.

See also
Paper Museum in Kita, Tokyo
 Washi
 List of washi

References

External links
  Tosa Paper (Japan Traditional Craft Centre)
  Ino Paper Museum (homepage)

Museums in Kōchi Prefecture
Japanese paper
Papermaking museums
Ino, Kōchi